Arar or Ar-Ar may refer to:

Geography and history
 Arar, Saudi Arabia, the capital of Al Hudud ash Shamaliyah (The Northern Border) province
 Arar border crossing, a Saudi-Iraqi border crossing near Arar, Saudi Arabia and Nukhayb, Iraq
 Arar, Pakistan, a village in Sargodha District, Pakistan
 Saône, a river in eastern France, formerly known as Arar
 Battle of the Arar, a battle between the Romans and the Helvetii in 58 BC

People
 Ege Arar (born 1996), Turkish basketball player
 Funda Arar (born 1975), Turkish singer
 Maher Arar (born 1970), Canadian-Syrian engineer, deported from the US
 Arar v. Ashcroft, a legal case brought by Maher Arar
 Mustafa Wahbi al-Tal (1897–1949), Jordanian poet nicknamed Arar
 Taleb Abu Arar (born 1967), Bedouin Israeli Arab politician

Science
 Argon–argon dating, a radiometric dating method
 Juniperus phoenicea, also known as Arâr, a juniper found throughout the Mediterranean region
 Tetraclinis, also known as arar, a genus of evergreen coniferous tree endemic to the western Mediterranean region

Organizations 
 Azienda Rilievo Alienazione Residuati, Italian war surplus disposal organization

See also
Arrar, a village in Chakwal District, Pakistan